Ramón Mendezona Roldán (November 3, 1913– 14 June 2001), also known as Pedro Aldámiz (name used in exile from Spain during the Franco regime) was a Spanish journalist and militian for the PCE.

Ramón was the son of a sailor from Mundaca, who disappeared when he was young. He spent his childhood in that town, and later studied in Logroño. He joined the Communist Youth in 1931, he took part in the Revolution of 1934, later he was prosecuted and imprisoned in Madrid model prison and freed during the triumph of the Popular Front. He founded the Proletarian Choirs and Orchestra.

Basque journalists
1913 births
2001 deaths
Exiles of the Spanish Civil War in the Soviet Union
People from Busturialdea
People from Rosario, Santa Fe
Argentine journalists
Spanish radio presenters
Argentine people of Basque descent
Argentine emigrants to Spain
Spanish communists